José Carvalho Gonçalves, known as Serra (born 9 December 1961) is a former Portuguese football player.

He played 12 seasons and 260 games in the Primeira Liga, mostly with Braga.

Club career
He made his professional debut in the Primeira Liga for Braga on 31 May 1981 as a starter in a 1–1 draw against Boavista.

References

1961 births
Sportspeople from Braga
Living people
Portuguese footballers
S.C. Braga players
Primeira Liga players
G.D. Chaves players
Vitória F.C. players
F.C. Paços de Ferreira players
Association football midfielders